The Morgan Building is an office building located in downtown Portland, Oregon, listed on the National Register of Historic Places.

The Morgan was home to Theodore Kruse's Rainbow Grill, which opened in October 1913. Kruse had closed his Louvre restaurant, a hotspot in the gay community, after it was a focal point of the 1912 Portland vice scandal. The Rainbow advertised "fat, juicy, delicious" oysters and a "Special Men's Grill" with meat of the diner's choosing. It closed in June 1915.

See also
 National Register of Historic Places listings in Southwest Portland, Oregon

References

External links
 

1913 establishments in Oregon
A. E. Doyle buildings
Beaux-Arts architecture in Oregon
Buildings and structures in Portland, Oregon
Commercial buildings on the National Register of Historic Places in Oregon
National Register of Historic Places in Portland, Oregon
Office buildings completed in 1913
Portland Historic Landmarks
Southwest Portland, Oregon